Silberhorn or Hubel is a mountain in Liechtenstein in the Rätikon range of the Eastern Alps close to the border with Switzerland, with a height of .

References
 
 

Mountains of the Alps
Mountains of Liechtenstein